Neopetraeus filiolus is a species of tropical air-breathing land snail, a pulmonate gastropod mollusk in the family Orthalicidae.

Distribution 
Distribution of Neopetraeus filiolus include Ancash Region and Lima Region, Peru.

References

Orthalicidae
Gastropods described in 1897